The rivière aux Iroquois is a tributary of lac Saint-Jean, flowing the municipality of Sainte-Hedwidge and Saint-Prime, in the Le Domaine-du-Roy Regional County Municipality, in the administrative region of Saguenay–Lac-Saint-Jean, in the province of Quebec, in Canada.

The upper part of the Iroquois river valley is served by the Chemin de la Lièvre, the Chemin du Lac-à-la-Loutre and the Chemin de la Rexfor; the intermediate part, via Chemin du Lac-du-Dix, Chemin du 9e rang and chemin du 8e rang; the lower part via Chemin du 3e rang, Route Marcel-Auclair and Rue Principale.
Forestry is the main economic activity in the middle part of this valley; agriculture, in the lower part.

The surface of the Iroquois River is usually frozen from the beginning of December to the end of March, except the rapids areas; however, traffic on the ice is generally safe from mid-December to mid-March.

Geography 
The Rivière aux Iroquois takes its source from Lac aux Iroquois in Sainte-Hedwidge. The mouth of Lac aux Iroquois is located at:
  west of the course of the Ouiatchouaniche River;
  south-west of the village center of Sainte-Hedwidge;
  south-west of the mouth of the Iroquois river.

  generally towards the north, forming many very small coils, collecting three streams (coming from the west), three others (coming from the east) and the discharge (coming from the east) from Lac à la Loutre, to the outlet (coming from the southwest) from Lac aux Outardes;
  towards the northwest by forming several small streamers, then turning west, until the outlet (coming from the south) of the Lac de la Savane;
  towards the north by skirting a mountain on the west side, then curving towards the northeast, until the outlet (coming from the north) of Lac du Dix;
  first towards the east, then towards the north by forming numerous small streamers and crossing several series of rapids at the end of the segments, until the confluence of the Second Bras de l'Iroquois;
  towards the north first in the forest zone in a deep valley, zigzagging while entering the plain, then entering agricultural by forming numerous streamers, up to a bend in the river;
  to the east, winding heavily in an agricultural area, cutting the route 169 (rue Principale de Saint-Prime), collecting the Perron stream (coming from the south) and cutting the railway at the end of the segment, to its mouth.

The Rivière aux Iroquois flows onto the southwest shore of lac Saint-Jean. This confluence is located between the villages of Saint-Prime and Pointe-Bleue, either:

  west of the center of the village of Pointe-Bleue;
  north of the village center of Saint-Prime;
  northwest of downtown Roberval.

Toponymy 
The toponym "Rivière aux Iroquois" is linked to that of the head lake and that of the main arm designated "Second arm to the Iroquois".

The toponym "Rivière aux Iroquois" was formalized on December 5, 1968, at the Place Names Bank of the Commission de toponymie du Québec.

Notes and references

Appendices

Related articles 
 Le Domaine-du-Roy Regional County Municipality
 Sainte-Hedwidge, a municipality
 Saint-Prime, a municipality
 Lac Saint-Jean, a body of water
 Deuxième Bras des Iroquois, a stream
 Saguenay River, a stream
 List of rivers of Saguenay basin

Rivers of Saguenay–Lac-Saint-Jean
Le Domaine-du-Roy Regional County Municipality